Inocybe fraudans, commonly known as the pear fibrecap, is an agaric fungus in the family Inocybaceae. It has a yellowish-brown fibrillose cap and stipe that develops reddish tints with age. The flesh has a characteristic odor, similar to jasmin or ripe pears, although the mushroom—like many in the genus Inocybe—is suspected to be toxic. It is found in Europe and North America, where it grows in woodlands. Fruitbodies produce an walnut-brown spore print, and have smooth, almond-shaped spores measuring 8–11.5 by 5–7 µm. Many authors have erroneously referred this species to Inocybe pyriodora.

See also
List of Inocybe species

References

External links

fraudans
Poisonous fungi
Fungi described in 1882
Fungi of Europe
Fungi of North America